Burgers’ Smokehouse is a smokehouse and producer of cured and smoked meats and other foods in California, Missouri. It is one of the largest processors of naturally cured hams in the U.S. The company's packaging says "Home of Hickory Smoked, Sugar Cured Meats since 1927", although the family's selling of hams by E.M. Burger and his German mother Hulda is said to go back to the 1920s. The company sells hams, bacon, sausage and over a dozen other specialty meats".

Operations
The award-winning supplier sells through grocery stores, restaurants, direct mail  and over the internet. Its facility is located 3 miles south of California, Missouri on State Highway 87.

Trivia
The 122-unit casual burger chain Hard Rock Cafe began offering items from Burgers' in 2007. The company has sent care packages to U.S. troops in Iraq.

References

External links
Burgers' Smokehouse website

Companies based in Missouri
Meat companies of the United States
Moniteau County, Missouri
Ham producers